Lincoln Arms Apartments is a historic three-story building in Salt Lake City, Utah. It was built in 1924–1925 by Phillip T. Bratt, who owned the building with his wife N. Myrtle Bratt until 1926, when they sold it to Katie R. Stevens. It was later owned by J.B. Arnovitz and James L. White (1931–32), followed by J.H. and Elizabeth Angel. It has been listed on the National Register of Historic Places since October 20, 1989.

References

National Register of Historic Places in Salt Lake City
Residential buildings completed in 1924
1924 establishments in Utah